Georgia Purdom (née Hickman; born 1972) is an American biologist and Young Earth creationist. She is the director of Educational Content at Answers in Genesis.

Early life
Purdom was born in 1972, and grew up near Columbus, Ohio in what she described as a "very strong Christian home". She attended a Nazarene church.

Education and career
Purdom studied at Cedarville University, graduating in 1994, before going on to get a PhD in molecular genetics from Ohio State University. She was an associate professor of biology at Mount Vernon Nazarene University before joining Answers in Genesis. She received the Alumna of the Year award from Cedarville in 2015.

Views
Purdom believes that whether one holds a "biblical versus secular" worldview determines how one interprets scientific data. She also believes that "available evidence supports and confirms biblical creation."

She is the editor of Galapagos Islands: A Different View (2013) which presents a "Bible-based analysis of the islands." Purdom claims that the Galápagos Islands were formed after the Genesis Flood.

Purdom distinguishes her creationist views with that of intelligent design, which she does not regard as Christian.

References

External links
 
 Blog at Answers in Genesis

1972 births
Living people
American Christian Young Earth creationists
Creation scientists
American women geneticists
American geneticists
Cedarville University alumni
Ohio State University alumni
Mount Vernon Nazarene University faculty
Molecular geneticists
American members of the Church of the Nazarene
Scientists from Ohio